Abdelwahed Radi (born 1935 in Salé, Morocco) is a Moroccan politician and current head of the Socialist Union of Popular Forces since November 2008. He was the President of the Assembly of Representatives of Morocco for two terms, from 1997 to 2007 and again from 2010 to 2011.

References

1935 births
Living people
Moroccan politicians
People from Salé
Presidents of the House of Representatives (Morocco)
Socialist Union of Popular Forces politicians